Shadow and Light (French: Ombre et lumière) is a 1951 French psychological drama film directed by Henri Calef and starring Simone Signoret, María Casares and Jean Marchat.

The film's sets were designed by Daniel Guéret and Rino Mondellini.

Plot

Cast
 Simone Signoret as Isabelle Leritz 
 María Casares as Caroline Bessier
 Jean Marchat as Schurmann
 Pierre Dux as Docteur Gennari
 Albert Plantier as Eugène
 Germaine Reuver as La patronne
 Albert Michel as Le patron
 Jacques Berthier as Jacques Barroy 
 René Berthier as Petit rôle
 Gérard Buhr as Le garçon de café
 Gérard Gervais as Petit rôle
 Yannick Muller
 Paul Villé as Le patron du restaurant

References

Bibliography
 Hayward, Susan. Simone Signoret: The Star as Cultural Sign. Continuum, 2004.

External links

1951 films
French psychological drama films
Films directed by Henri Calef
1950s psychological drama films
1950s French-language films
1951 drama films
French black-and-white films
Films scored by Joseph Kosma
1950s French films